USS Guam may refer to:

  was a river gunboat in China, renamed Wake in January 1941 and captured by the Japanese in December
 , formerly , is a ferry used to transport troops in Okinawa

United States Navy ship names